Tolumnia guianensis is a species of orchid endemic to Hispaniola.

guianensis